Capsize Glacier is a tributary glacier in the Deep Freeze Range, draining the slopes between Mount Cavaney and Mount Levick and flowing northeast to enter the Campbell Glacier, in Victoria Land. It was so named by the Northern Party of the New Zealand Geological Survey Antarctic Expedition, 1965–66, because of the spectacular spill which the party had there.

References
 

Glaciers of Victoria Land
Scott Coast